Copenhagen AirTaxi (CAT) is an aviation company and flight school based in Roskilde, Denmark. It provide a range of services, including operating regularly scheduled flights from Copenhagen Airport, Roskilde  to the Danish islands of Anholt and Læsø; managing the airfield on Anholt, and is also a major airtaxi operator in Denmark, operating from EKRK. CAT is an experienced flight school with flight training leading to a private and commercial pilots license. With large modern facilities based in Roskilde, the school trains the future generation of professional pilots in Denmark. CAT also has a large maintenance facility specialized in General Aviation aircraft.

The company was a first-mover in Europe to introduce charter flights (airtaxi) on single engine turboprop aircraft under new legislation CAT SET-IMC. In 2017, CAT introduced the Pilatus PC-12 business aircraft to its fleet. The aircraft reaches destinations all over Europe, and have exceptional performance for short field operations.

The scheduled route between Roskilde – Anholt – Læsø is operated by a 10-seat Britten-Norman BN-2 Islander, but this may be substituted or augmented with one of the company's 6-seat Partenavia P.68's

Aircraft fleet 
For use by the resident flight school, airtaxi, scheduled flights or for rental purposes, the company has a fleet including:

Scheduled destinations

As of May 2019 CAT operates to:

Roskilde
Læsø
Anholt

AirZafari 

AirZafari is a Greenlandic aviation company whose primary business is sightseeing-flying. The company was founded in 2011 and is operated on the AOC certificate of Copenhagen AirTaxi.

References

External links
Copenhagen AirTaxi hjemmeside
Rutetaxa hjemmeside
AirZafari Greenland

Aviation schools
Airlines of Denmark
Danish companies established in 1961
Roskilde